The Höhlensteintal is a side valley of the Puster Valley in South Tyrol, Italy.

References 
Alpenverein South Tyrol

External links 

Valleys of South Tyrol